This is a list of people associated with the University of Zambia.

Government

Heads of State
 Levy Mwanawasa, late Zambian president, studied law at UNZA
 Edgar Lungu, former Zambian president, studied law at UNZA
 Emmerson Mnangagwa, President of the Republic of Zimbabwe
 Hakainde Hichilema, current Zambian President

Vice-Presidents
 Inonge Wina, current vice president of Zambia, obtained a BA degree at UNZA
 George Kunda, former vice president of Zambia

Cabinet level

 Nkandu Luo, Professor of Microbiology and Immunology and former head of Pathology and Microbiology at the University Teaching Hospital, Lusaka, Zambia
 Margaret Mwanakatwe, Minister of Finance
 Chitalu Chilufya, Minister of Health
 Brian Mushimba, Minister of Higher Education

Supreme Court
 Ireen Mambilima, late Chief Justice of Zambia
 Florence Mumba, Judge of the Khmer Rouge Tribunal and Justice of the Supreme Court of Zambia

Members of Parliament
 Jonas Chanda, Member of the National Assembly for Bwana Mkubwa
 Stanley Kakubo, Member of the National Assembly for Kapiri Mposhi
 Highvie Hamududu, former Member of the National Assembly for Bweengwa

International
 Chileshe Kapwepwe, Secretary General of the Common Market for Eastern and Southern Africa
 Ruhakana Rugunda, Prime Minister of Uganda
 Nahas Angula, Namibian Minister of Defence  
 Brigitte Mabandla, former South African Minister of Public Enterprises

Ambassadors

 Monica Nashandi, Namibian ambassador and 1983 graduate
 Inonge Mbikusita-Lewanika, Zambian Ambassador to the United States of America.

Opposition leaders
 Edith Nawakwi, Leader of the Forum for Democracy and Development and former Minister of Finance.

Business
 Mizinga Melu, Chief Executive Officer, Barclays Bank of Zambia
 Chibamba Kanyama, business Leader and writer
Thandi Ndlovu, South African businesswoman and medical doctor
Bokani Soko, Zambian businessman and sponsor of Lusaka Dynamos Football Club

Other alumni
 Edward Makuka Nkoloso, founder of the Zambia National Academy of Science, Space Research and Philosophy
 Mulenga Kapwepwe, patron of the arts 
 Dambisa Moyo, economist 
 Sir Alimuddin Zumla, Professor of Infectious Diseases and International Health at the University College London Medical School.
 Ellen Banda-Aaku, writer 
 John Matshikiza, South African actor 
Muyoba Macwan, physicist
Aaron Mujajati, physician
Michael Burawoy, sociologist